Omu Okwei or Okwei of Osomari (1872–1943) was a Nigerian queen merchant from Osomari.

Life and career
Omu Okwei was born in 1872 to Igbo Prince Osuna Afubeho and one of his wives, a granddaughter of Abo king Obi Ossai. At the age of nine, her mother sent her to live among the Igala with one of her aunts. She learned basic business practices, and traded fruits, yams and poultry. When she was 15, following the death of her father, she lived with her mother at Atani, a city on the Niger River.

In 1889, she married Joseph Allagoa, a trader from Brass. Her family disapproved of her choice and did not give her a dowry. The couple had a child, Joseph, and divorced the following year. She traversed the Niger River, selling clothing, pots, and lamps. She exchanged the merchandise for food which she then sold to Europeans. In 1895 she married Opene of Abo, whose mother was Okwenu Ezewene (1896–1904), another wealthy woman trader. Okwei had a second son, Peter.

The British colonial government formalized male institutions while undermining those of the women. Officials issued warrants to men that gave them the authority to sit in Native courts. Okwei was one of few women who were offered a warrant and served in the Onitsha Native Court from 1912 until the 1930s.

She was given the title of omu of the Osomari in August 1935. In the traditional dual-sex government, the omu was the apex leader of the congress of women leaders, overseeing women's affairs and settling disputes.

She was elected Market Queen, Chairwoman of the Council of Mothers after amassing a fortune. She was the last merchant queen before the British replaced the Council of Mothers' traditional role supervising retailing.
She is the great great grandmother of Nigerian-British singer Ikstarr.
Okwei died in 1943 in Onitsha, Nigeria.

References

Further reading
Boahen, A. Topics in West African History. London: Longmans, 1966.
Coleman, J.S. Nigeria: Background to Nationalism. Berkeley, CA: University of California Press, 1971.
Ekejiuba, Felicia. "Omu Okwei of Osomari," in Nigerian Women in Historical Perspective. Edited by Bolanle Awe. Lagos, Nigeria: Sankore Publishers, 1992, pp. 89–104.
——. "Omu Okwei, the Merchant Queen of Osomari: A Biographical Sketch," in Journal of the Historical Society of Nigeria. Vol. III, no. 4, 1967.
Hatch, John Charles. Nigeria. A History. London: Secker & Warburg, 1971.
Okonjo, Kamene. "Nigerian Women's Participation in National Politics: Legitimacy and Stability in an Era of Transition," in Working Paper #221. East Lansing, MI: Women and International Development Program, Michigan State University, July 1991.

1872 births
1943 deaths
19th-century Nigerian businesspeople
20th-century Nigerian businesspeople
Igbo businesspeople
People from colonial Nigeria
Igbo royalty
19th-century Nigerian businesswomen
20th-century Nigerian businesswomen
History of women in Nigeria